Elwood Passenger and Freight Depot, also known as the Elwood Train Depot, was a historic train station located at Elwood, Madison County, Indiana.  It was built in 1894 by the Norfolk and Western Railway.  It was a -story, Richardsonian Romanesque style yellow-orange brick building with a steeply pitched hipped roof. It was officially retired from service in August 1975. Passenger Depot torn down in June, 1983. The Freight Depot was burned in a control fire on January 5, 1990.

It was listed on the National Register of Historic Places in 1980 and delisted in 1984.

References

Former National Register of Historic Places in Indiana
Railway stations on the National Register of Historic Places in Indiana
Richardsonian Romanesque architecture in Indiana
Railway stations in the United States opened in 1894
Norfolk and Western Railway stations
National Register of Historic Places in Madison County, Indiana
Transportation buildings and structures in Madison County, Indiana